HMAS Assault is a former Royal Australian Navy (RAN) training centre that was in use during World War II, located at Nelson Bay in the Mid North Coast region of New South Wales, Australia.

Formation and history
In June 1942, Royal Navy Commander F. N. Cook, the former commander of the Combined Operations Centre –  – who was on loan to the RAN to help establish an Australian combined operations school, identified Port Stephens as the ideal location to establish a RAN training base for amphibious landings. On 9 August, General Douglas MacArthur ordered the establishment of the Joint Overseas Operational Training School (JOOTS) at Port Stephens. While the base was under construction,  was assigned to the area as an accommodation ship, with  serving as a tender.

The stone frigate HMAS Assault was commissioned on 1 September 1942; Assault was initially operated from Westralia, but moved ashore on 10 December 1942. The base's main purpose was to train boat crews for landing craft, beach commandos to prepare beaches and co-ordinate landings on the shore, and signals sections to facilitate communications between ships and land-based forces. By March 1943, enough landing craft had been manufactured in Australia and delivered from the United States to allow for full-scale landing exercises. For administrative purposes, landing and shore personnel trained at Assault were considered to be attached to the base, not the ships that they were embarked in.

The Naval Training Center at Assault was used to train landing craft crews, beach parties and signal teams. Between September 1942 and October 1943 the following Naval personnel were trained at HMAS Assault:
100 officers
100 coxswains
120 beach commanders
453 boat crews
250 stokers
40 signalmen

The RAN continued training its own boat and beach crews at Assault until August 1944, when the base was decommissioned and reduced to a caretaker establishment. In April 1945, the base was given to the Royal Navy, who used it as a Commando Depot for the Royal Marines units attached to the British Pacific Fleet.

Assaults sickbay was used as migrant accommodation from 1949 to 1953. It was opened as a small hospital in 1956, then closed in 1981. On 10 August 1981 the buildings were handed over to the Port Stephens Society of the Arts and are now used as the Port Stephens Community Arts Centre.

See also
List of former Royal Australian Navy bases

References

 

Closed facilities of the Royal Australian Navy
Port Stephens Council
Military education and training in Australia
Military establishments in the Hunter Region
1942 establishments in Australia
1945 disestablishments in Australia
Military units and formations established in 1942
Military units and formations disestablished in 1945
Former military installations in New South Wales